Yugoslavia competed at the 1984 Summer Olympics in Los Angeles, United States which took place from 29 July to 12 August 1984. Yugoslav athletes had competed in every Summer Olympic Games since their official debut in 1920. The Yugoslav Olympic Committee (JOK) sent a delegation of 139 athletes, 105 men and 34 women, competing in 16 sports, down from 164 competitors in 1980. Due to the Soviet-led boycott, Yugoslavia was one of only three Communist countries to take part at the Games, along with China and Romania.

Yugoslavia left Los Angeles with a total of 18 Olympic medals (7 gold, 4 silver, and 7 bronze), finishing ninth in the overall medal standings, the best total in the history of Yugoslavia's participation in the Olympics. Five of these medals were won in team sports and included gold in both men's and women's handball tournaments, gold in the water polo tournament and bronze medals in men's football and basketball. The most successful sport was wrestling, winning the nation five medals, while the canoeing duo of Matija Ljubek and Mirko Nišović were the only Yugoslav athletes who won more than a single Olympic medal. For the first time in its history, Yugoslavia sent athletes to compete in rhythmic gymnastics, a new event introduced into the Olympic programme, with 14-year-old gymnast Danijela Simić the youngest participant in the entire Yugoslav delegation. 

Among the nation's medalists were canoeist Matija Ljubek, who took his third and fourth career Olympic medals, wrestler Shaban Sejdiu, who won his second career Olympic bronze medal, another wrestler Shaban Tërstena became the youngest Olympic Champion ever in Wrestling after winning his Gold medal with the age of 19 in the Men's freestyle 52 kg. Rowers Zoran Pančić and Milorad Stanulov who won a bronze medal in double sculls after winning silver in the same event in 1980. Water polo coach Ratko Rudić led the national men's team to triumph in the tournament, a feat he would repeat in 1988.

Medalists

Yugoslavia finished in ninth position in the final medal rankings, with seven gold medals and 18 medals overall.  Both totals were Yugoslavia's best ever performance at the Olympic Games.

| width="78%" align="left" valign="top" |

| width="22%" align="left" valign="top" |

Competitors
The following is the list of number of Yugoslav athletes participating in the Games:

Athletics

Men
Field events

Women
Field events

Basketball

Men's tournament
Roster
 Dražen Dalipagić
 Sabit Hadžić
 Andro Knego
 Emir Mutapčić
 Mihovil Nakić
 Aleksandar Petrović
 Dražen Petrović
 Ratko Radovanović
 Ivan Sunara
 Branko Vukićević
 Rajko Žižić
 Nebojša Zorkić

Preliminary round (Group A)

 Preliminary round (group A)
 Defeated West Germany (96-83)
 Defeated Australia (94-64)
 Defeated Egypt (100-69)
 Defeated Brazil (98-85)
 Defeated Italy (69-65)
 Quarterfinals
 Defeated Uruguay (110-82)
 Semifinals
 Lost to Spain (61-74)
 Bronze Medal Match
 Defeated Canada (88-82) →  Bronze Medal

Women's tournament
 Preliminary round
 Lost to United States (55-83)
 Lost to South Korea (52-55)
 Lost to PR China (58-79)
 Defeated Canada (69-68)
 Lost to Australia (59-62) → Sixth and last place
 Team roster
 Sanja Ožegović
 Slavica Šuka
 Jelica Komnenović
 Zagorka Počeković
 Stojna Vangelovska
 Slavica Pečikoza
 Slađana Golić
 Polona Dornik
 Biljana Majstorović
 Jasmina Perazić
 Cvetana Dekleva
 Marija Uzelac

Boxing

Men's Flyweight (– 51 kg)
 Redžep Redžepovski →  Silver Medal
 First Round — Defeated Sanguo Teraporn (THA), 3:2
 Second Round — Defeated Pat Clinton (GBR), KO-2
 Quarterfinals — Defeated Jeff Fenech (AUS), 4:1
 Semifinals — Defeated Ibrahim Bilali (KEN), 5:0
 Final — Lost to Steve McCrory (USA), 4:1

Men's Bantamweight (– 54 kg)
 Ljubiša Simić
 First Round — Lost to Pedro Nolasco (DOM), 1:4

Men's Lightweight (– 60 kg)
 Slobodan Pavlović

Men's Light welterweight (– 63.5 kg)
 Mirko Puzović

Men's Middleweight (– 75 kg)
 Damir Škaro

Men's Light-Heavyweight (– 81 kg)
 Anton Josipović

Men's Super Heavyweight (+ 91 kg)
 Aziz Salihu →  Bronze Medal
 First Round – Bye
 Quarterfinals – Defeated Peter Hussing (FRG), 3:2 
 Semifinals – Lost to Tyrell Biggs (USA), 0:5

Canoeing

Men's K-1 500 metres
 Milan Janić

Men's K-1 1000 metres
 Milan Janić

Men's C-2 500 metres
 Matija Ljubek, Mirko Nišović

Men's C-2 1000 metres
 Matija Ljubek, Mirko Nišović

Cycling

Six cyclists represented Yugoslavia in 1984.

Individual road race
 Bojan Ropret — +1:19 (→ 7th place)
 Primož Čerin — +15:30 (→ 35th place)
 Jure Pavlič — +18:04 (→ 42nd place)
 Marko Cuderman — +22:20 (→ 46th place)

Team time trial
 Bruno Bulić
 Primož Čerin
 Janez Lampič
 Bojan Ropret

Equestrianism

Individual dressage 
 Alojz Lah
 Dušan Mavec
 Stojan Moderc

Team dressage
 Alojz Lah
 Dušan Mavec
 Stojan Moderc

Football

Men's tournament
Roster

Group play

 Preliminary round (group B)
 Defeated Cameroon (2-1)
 Defeated Canada (1-0)
 Defeated Iraq (4-2)
 Quarterfinals
 Defeated West Germany (5-2)
 Semifinals
 Lost to France (2-4, after extra time)
 Bronze Medal Match
 Defeated Italy (2-1) →  Bronze Medal
 Team roster

Gymnastics

Individual all-around
 Milena Reljin
 Danijela Simić

Handball

Men's tournament
 Team roster
 Zlatan Arnautović
 Mirko Bašić
 Jovica Elezović
 Mile Isaković
 Pavle Jurina
 Milan Kalina
 Slobodan Kuzmanovski
 Dragan Mladenović
 Zdravko Rađenović
 Momir Rnić
 Branko Štrbac
 Veselin Vujović
 Veselin Vuković
 Zdravko Zovko
 Head coach: Branislav Pokrajac

Women's tournament
 Preliminary Round Robin
 Yugoslavia – Federal Republic of Germany 20:19 (11:12)
 Yugoslavia – Austria 30:15 (15:8)
 Yugoslavia – United States 33:20 (14:10)
 Yugoslavia – South Korea 29:23 (15:14)
 Yugoslavia – China 31:25 (15:15) →  Gold Medal
 Team roster
 Jasna Ptujec
 Mirjana Ognjenović
 Zorica Pavićević
 Ljubinka Janković
 Svetlana Anastasovska
 Svetlana Dašić
 Emilija Erčić
 Alenka Cuderman
 Svetlana Mugoša 
 Mirjana Đurica
 Biserka Višnjić
 Slavica Đukić
 Jasna Kolar-Merdan
 Ljiljana Mugoša
 Dragica Đurić
 Head coach: Josip Samaržija

Judo

Men's Half-Lightweight
 Franc Očko

Men's Lightweight
 Vojo Vujević

Men's Half-Middleweight
 Filip Leščak

Men's Middleweight
 Stanko Lopatić

Men's Heavyweight
 Radomir Kovačević

Rowing

Men

Sailing

Men

Shooting

Men's 10m Air Rifle
 Rajmond Debevec
 Šaćir Džeko

Men's 50m 3 Positions
 Goran Maksimović
 Rajmond Debevec

Men's 50m Rifle Prone
 Goran Maksimović

Women's 10m Air Rifle
 Valentina Atanaskovski
 Mirjana Jovović

Women's 50m 3 Positions
 Biserka Vrbek
 Mirjana Jovović

Swimming

Men's 200 m Freestyle
 Borut Petrič
 Heat — 1:52.74 (→ did not advance, 19th place)
 Darjan Petrič
 Heat — 1:55.68 (→ did not advance, 30th place)

Men's 400 m Freestyle
 Darjan Petrič
 Heat — 3:54.39
 Final — 3:54.88 (→ 6th place)
 Borut Petrič
 Heat — 3:56.07
 B-Final — scratched (→ 18th place)

Men's 1500 m Freestyle 
 Borut Petrič
 Heat — 15:36.44 (→ did not advance, 15th place)
 Darjan Petrič
 Heat — 15:39.79 (→ did not advance, 16th place)

Men's 100 m Butterfly
 Hrvoje Barić
 Heat — 56.70 (→ did not advance, 29th place)

Water polo

Men's tournament
 Team roster
 Milorad Krivokapić
 Deni Lušić
 Zoran Petrović
 Božo Vuletić
 Veselin Đuho
 Zoran Roje
 Milivoj Bebić
 Perica Bukić
 Goran Sukno
 Tomislav Paškvalin
 Igor Milanović
 Dragan Andrić
 Andrija Popović

Wrestling

Greco-Roman
Men's Lightweight
 Vlado Lisjak

Men's Welterweight
 Karlo Kasap

Men's Middleweight
 Momir Petković

Men's Light-Heavyweight
 Karolj Kopas

Men's Heavyweight
 Jožef Tertei

Men's Super-Heavyweight
 Refik Memišević

Freestyle
Men's Flyweight
 Šaban Trstena

Men's Bantamweight
 Zoran Šorov

Men's Welterweight
 Šaban Sejdi

References

External links
Official Olympic Reports
International Olympic Committee results database

Nations at the 1984 Summer Olympics
1984
Summer Olympics